Melbourne tram route 70 is operated by Yarra Trams on the Melbourne tram network from Waterfront City to Wattle Park. The 16.5 kilometre route is operated out of Camberwell depot with A and B class trams.

History
Most of the line currently used by route 70 was initially built and run by the Hawthorn Tramways Trust (HTT) in 1916–17. It ran between the Batman Avenue terminus (opposite Flinders Street station) to the intersection of Warrigal Road (then Boundary Road) and Riversdale Road. At the time, the HTT's Batman Avenue line was Melbourne's only electric tram line that reached the CBD. The Melbourne & Metropolitan Tramways Board took over the line in 1920, and in 1928, extended the line a further two kilometres to Wattle Park at the Riversdale Road and Elgar Road intersection. In 1934, the line was given the route 70 designation, which it still holds today.

On 6 June 1999 it was diverted to operate via the Exhibition Street extension with a four-lane divided road built over the Jolimont Yard, enabling Batman Avenue west of Melbourne Park to be closed with route 70 extended to terminate at the intersection of Flinders and Spencer Streets. This new route was better able to serve all of the Melbourne Park venues such as the Melbourne Cricket Ground and Rod Laver Arena. Extra sidings were also built along the route in order to accommodate special events. 

On 4 May 2003, it was extended to the corner of Spencer and La Trobe Streets., on 5 January 2005, to Docklands Stadium and on 20 September 2009 to Waterfront City.

Route
From Waterfront City, the route runs along Docklands Drive, Harbour Esplanade and Flinders Street in the city, behind Melbourne Park at Richmond and then along Swan Street and Riversdale Road through Hawthorn and Camberwell to the eastern end of Wattle Park, terminating at Elgar Road.

Operation
Route 70 is operated out of Camberwell depot with A class trams, although B class trams are occasionally used. During the Australian Open it is operated by B class trams for extra capacity. Additional services run between Melbourne Park and the city. These services are signed as Route 70a and run a mix of B and E class trams.

Route map

References

External links

070
070
1917 establishments in Australia
Transport in the City of Whitehorse
Transport in the City of Boroondara
Transport in the City of Yarra